St George's Weybridge is an independent mixed Roman Catholic co-educational Josephite day school in Surrey, taking pupils from 3 to 18. St George's Weybridge is made up of St George's Junior School (3–11) and St George's College (11–18).

History
St George’s Weybridge was founded in 1869 by a Belgium Catholic order of priests called the Josephites, and was originally based in Croydon. Within a few years St George’s had outgrown its Croydon location and in 1884 moved to the grounds of Woburn Park near Weybridge. In the 18th century, Woburn Park became famous as the first ornamental farm developed by its then-owner, Philip Southcote. After his death, the estate had numerous owners including William Petre, who purchased the estate in 1876 and established the first Catholic school on the site before he sold it to the Josephites.

The Josephite order once provided the entire staff and management of the school. Today, although much reduced in number, they still reside on the same site.

St George’s was originally a boys' boarding school but starting in the 1960s girls were allowed to join the 6th Form. St George’s became a day school in 1992, became co-educational in 1998, and in 2000 absorbed the nearby girls' school St Maur’s, run by the Congregation of the Holy Infant Jesus. The acquisition of the St Maur’s site resulted in another phase of expansion and provided a new home for the Junior School in central Weybridge.

Overview
The school's mission statement is "To inspire all in our Josephite, Georgian Family to be the very best version of themselves."

The college is on the outskirts of Addlestone and consists of approximately 1000 pupils aged between eleven and eighteen, and six houses: King, Woburn, Kilmorey, Southcote, Stirling, and Petre, the original four (Kilmorey, Southcote, Stirling and Petre) named after the four owners of the building before it was converted to a school and King and Woburn were added in 2017. The Junior School is in Weybridge, close to the high street, with around 600 pupils aged between three and eleven. It has four houses: Owls, Eagles, Hawks, and Kestrels, represented by green, yellow, black/white and maroon respectively.

The college sports facilities are extensive and include three outdoor netball courts, two 11-a-side hockey pitches, five rugby pitches, a 400m athletics track, dance studio, and three football pitches. In the summer there are six rounders pitches and five cricket pitches. The tennis centre provides four indoor courts, three outdoor clay courts and three grass courts. The activity centre opened in October 2019 and has a large sports hall, climbing wall, two dance studios and a fitness gym. The six-court sports hall provides facilities for hockey, badminton, volleyball, basketball, netball, 5-a-side football, cricket  and trampolining. There is also a boathouse for the St George's College Boat Club.

The River Bourne (Chertsey Branch) enters the grounds in the north-west corner and the River Bourne (Addlestone Branch) enters the school grounds from the south-east corner. The two rivers meet in the northeastern corner before flowing northwards into the River Thames at Addlestone. The college owns a boathouse on the Thames in nearby Walton.

There is an attached junior school, St George's Junior School Weybridge, which occupies . The previous name for the junior school was Woburn Hill School and the grounds of what was Woburn Park here is a listed park and garden in the English Heritage protection register.

Notable alumni

 Marcus Agius
 David Atkinson
 Sean Bobbitt
 Adam Hollioake
 Ben Hollioake
 Daniel Kawczynski
 Will Jacks
 David Laws
 Stephen Lloyd
 Sir Simon Mayall
 Richard Moore
 Monique Roffey
 Sir Clive Sinclair
 Anthony Watson
 Marcus Watson
 Isabel Webster
 Stuart Wilde

References

External links
 St George's College website
 Profile on the ISC website

Private schools in Surrey
Member schools of the Headmasters' and Headmistresses' Conference
Educational institutions established in 1869
Roman Catholic private schools in the Diocese of Arundel and Brighton
1869 establishments in England